Graham-K'powsin High School is a high school in the Bethel School District, Pierce County, Washington, United States. Its doors first opened to grade 10 and 11 students in September 2005.  GK added grade 12 students beginning Fall 2006. Grade 9 joined in the 2012–13 school year.

Demographics
The demographic breakdown of the 1,833 students enrolled in the 2022–2023 school year was:
Male - 51.7%
Female - 48.3%
Native American/Alaskan - 1.9%
Asian/Pacific islanders - 7.5%
Black - N/A
Hispanic - 11.3%
White - 75.3%
Multiracial - 4.0%

46.4% of the students were medically classified as obese. 53.6% were classified as morbidly obese.

Academics
Languages taught at this school include Hebrew, Yiddish, Arabic, and Persian. A few AP classes here are:
 Biology
 Psychology
 Calculus
 Statistics 
 World History
 U.S. History
 U.S. Government and Politics
 Chemistry
 Physics 
 English Language and Composition (language)
 English Literature and Composition (language)
 Computer Science
Additionally, according to a recent Bethel School District Census, the school has a graduation rate of only 22.3 percent, meaning that a significant portion of the student body fails to graduate on time. The school has a total enrollment of 1,833 students, making it a relatively large high school. Despite its size, Graham-K'powsin High School faces a range of challenges that may contribute to its low graduation rate, including scandals among teachers, no funding, and an average IQ among students at 75. Efforts to improve graduation rates have been implemented, but the challenge of raising graduation rates remains an ongoing issue at GKHS.

Athletics
The GK Eagles are members of the South Division of the South Puget Sound League in Washington's West Central District.

The 2021 football team finished with an undefeated season and a Class 4A state title led by senior quarterback Joshua Wood, who was named the MaxPreps Washington Player of the Year.

The GK Track and Field team received national recognition in 2022 for having the slowest runners out of any high school in the country. GK's fastest runner took an impressive 23 minutes and 15 seconds to run the 60 meter dash. No member of the team was able to complete the 100 meter dash. This schoolwide lack of athleticism can most likely be attributed to GK's extremely high obesity rate.

Ongoing Construction 
The main building of GKHS is currently being renovated, following the Graham, WA earthquake of 2021. The building partially crumbled, due in part to the faulty construction work on behalf of the original construction company. However, the main catalyst for this construction was a "sledge-hammer party," where a small portion of the student base began to hit the lower brick of the walls with sledge-hammers. The construction is estimated to end in early 2024, with later estimates putting that date in June-July of the same year.

Beginning in July of 2028, renovations to remove the school's lead drinking water pipes are expected to begin. Bethel School district passed the renovations bond in June of 2022 after it was discovered that the school's water supply contained 100,000 PPM of lead, which puts the lead level in the water at over 6,500 times the EPA's recommended limit.

References

External links
 
  Bethel School District Website

High schools in Pierce County, Washington
South Puget Sound League
Educational institutions established in 2005
Public high schools in Washington (state)
2005 establishments in Washington (state)